François-Xavier Audouin (18 April 1765– 23 July 1837), commonly called Xavier Audouin, was a French clergyman and politician during the French Revolution. He was a member of the Jacobin Club,  in which he frequently made speeches. Before the Great Revolution, he was a parish priest in Limoges.

Biography
Born in 1765 into an old bourgeois family in Limoges,  Xavier Audouin was the son of a master tanner. He was a parish priest in Limoges before the outbreak of the French Revolution.  He took an active part during the Revolution,  and was secretary of the Paris Jacobins.

On 15 January 1793, Audouin married Marie-Sylvie Pache, the daughter of Jean-Nicolas Pache, and the witnesses at the wedding were Antoine Joseph Santerre and Jacques Hébert.

Works

References

People from Limoges
1765 births
1837 deaths
18th-century French journalists
19th-century French journalists
French male journalists
19th-century French judges
18th-century French Roman Catholic priests
Jacobins
People of the French Revolution
19th-century French male writers
18th-century French male writers